Jahangir Mirza (born 28 February 1987) is a Pakistani first-class cricketer who played for Lahore cricket team.

References

External links
 

1987 births
Living people
Pakistani cricketers
Lahore cricketers
Nugegoda Sports and Welfare Club cricketers
Cricketers from Lahore